St John's Church, Port Ellen is a Category B listed building in Port Ellen, Islay, Argyll and Bute, Scotland.

History
The memorial stone for the new church was laid by Mrs Ramsay of Kidalton on 1 October 1897.  It was built to replace the former churches at Lagavulin as the congregation in Port Ellen had grown. It is a single storey church in the Arts and Crafts style built on a rectangular plan. It was built to the designs of the architect Arthur George Sydney Mitchell.

There are three stained glass windows:
A memorial to Revd. James Mackinnon, minister from 1894 to 1938 depicting Christ the Good Shepherd  
A memorial to Iain Ramsay of Kidalton, killed on 30 April 1942
A window depicting a haymaking scene.

Organ
An organ was gifted in 1945 in memory of Pilot Officer Alastair MacTaggart and five others of the parish who were killed on active service during the Second World War.

References

Port Ellen
Buildings and structures completed in 1898
Port Ellen
Port Ellen
Port Ellen
Islay
1898 establishments in Scotland